The Girls' Singles tournament of the 2018 European Junior Badminton Championships was held from September 11–16. Julie Dawall Jakobsen from Denmark clinched this title in the last edition. Hungarian Reka Madarasz leads the seedings this year.

Seeded

  Reka Madarasz (semi-finals)
  Vivien Sandorhazi (semi-finals)
  Line Christophersen (champions)
  Anastasiia Pustinskaia (fourth round)
  Anastasiia Shapovalova (quarter-finals)
  Maria Delcheva (quarter-finals)
  Tereza Svabikova (quarter-finals)
  Petra Polanc (fourth round)
  Hristomira Popovska (third round)
  Elena Andreu (fourth round)
  Vlada Ginga (fourth round)
  Anastasiya Prozorova (fourth round)
  Léonice Huet (quarter-finals)
  Ann-Kathrin Spori (fourth round)
  Valeriya Rudakova (third round)
  Ashwathi Pillai (third round)

Draw

Finals

Top half

Section 1

Section 2

Section 3

Section 4

Bottom half

Section 5

Section 6

Section 7

Section 8

References

External links 
Main Draw

European Junior Badminton Championships
European Junior Badminton Championships
European Junior Badminton Championships
European Junior Badminton Championships
International sports competitions hosted by Estonia